Agrotis herzogi (Spalding's dart) is a moth of the family Noctuidae. It is found in the eremic zone from North Africa to the Arabian Peninsula and Iran.

Adults are on wing from October to April depending on the location. There is one generation per year.

External links
Lepiforum.de

Agrotis
Moths of the Arabian Peninsula
Moths of Africa
Moths of the Middle East
Moths described in 1911
Taxa named by Hans Rebel